The Douglas XP3D was a prototype American patrol flying boat of the 1930s.  A twin-engined high-winged monoplane, the P3D was produced by the Douglas Aircraft Company to equip the US Navy's Patrol squadrons, but despite meeting the Navy's requirements, the rival Consolidated PBY was preferred owing to a lower price.

Development and design
In 1933, the United States Navy placed orders with both Douglas and Consolidated Aircraft for single prototypes of patrol flying boats, to replace the Consolidated P2Y and Martin P3M that equipped the Navy's patrol squadrons. Douglas's design, the P3D, was designed in parallel with the smaller YB-11 being developed for the United States Army Air Corps (which was eventually built as the YOA-5), and like the YB-11, was a twin-engined high-winged monoplane with its engines (the new Pratt & Whitney R-1830 Twin Wasp radial engine mounted in nacelles above and ahead of the wing. Unlike the YB-11, it was a pure flying boat rather than an amphibian, and was therefore fitted with retractable beaching gear to allow it to be moved to and from shore, rather than a full undercarriage allowing operation from land or sea.

The Douglas prototype, designated XP3D-1, first flew on 6 February 1935, and was delivered to NAS San Diego for testing in March 1935.  Both the XP3D-1 and Consolidated's P3Y successfully passed the Navy's performance tests, demonstrated very similar performance, an order was placed for 60 P3Ys (re-designated PBY in May 1936) because the Consolidated aircraft was cheaper, costing $90,000 per aircraft compared with $110,000 for the Douglas aircraft.

Douglas re-designed the P3D to improve performance in order to win follow-on contracts, and rebuilt the XP3D-1, raising the wing by 27 inches (0.69 m) and mounting the engines on the leading edge of the wing.  The fixed wing floats were replaced by retractable floats, and a nose turret was fitted. The rebuilt aircraft, designated XP3D-2 was re-delivered on 15 May 1935, but production orders again went to Consolidated, for the improved PBY-2.

Operational history

The XP3D-1 was briefly operated by Patrol Squadron 3 (VP-3) until it was returned to Douglas for re-building.  The re-built XP3D-2 was used by VP-11F as an VIP aircraft until destroyed in a crash at Acapulco Bay, Mexico on 8 February 1937. The crash was survived by the embarked VIP, Rear Admiral Ernest King.

Variants
XP3D-1
Prototype aircraft.  Two 825 hp (615 kW) R-1830-58 engines.
XP3D-2
Rebuilt XP3D-1, with raised wing, engines moved to wing leading edge and retractable wing floats.  Two 900 hp (671 kW) R-1830-64 engines.

Operators

United States Navy

Specifications (XP3D-2)

See also

References
Notes

Bibliography

Creed, Roscoe. PBY: The Catalina Flying Boat. Shrewsbury, UK:Airlife Publishing, 1986. .
Francillon, René J. McDonnell Douglas Aircraft since 1920. London:Putnam, 1979. .
Swanborough, Gordon and Peter M. Bowers. United States Navy Aircraft since 1911. London:Putnam, 1976. .
Wagner, Ray, American Combat Planes, Doubleday & Company, Garden City, New York, 1982,

External links

 1000Aircraftphotos
 California Secret. Time, March 25, 1935.

Flying boats
1930s United States patrol aircraft
High-wing aircraft
P3D
Aircraft first flown in 1935
Twin piston-engined tractor aircraft